Ellsworth and Lovie Ballance House is a historic home located at Hatteras, Dare County, North Carolina.  It was built about 1915, and is a two-story, three-bay, "T"-shaped frame dwelling.  It sits on a brick pier foundation and has board-and-batten siding.  The front facade features a hipped roof front porch.  It is an example of a characteristic Hatteras house form.

It was listed on the National Register of Historic Places in 2001.

References

Houses on the National Register of Historic Places in North Carolina
Houses completed in 1915
Houses in Dare County, North Carolina
National Register of Historic Places in Dare County, North Carolina
1915 establishments in North Carolina